Easton High School (EHS) is a four-year comprehensive public high school in Easton, Talbot County, Maryland, United States. It is one of two public high schools in Talbot County along with St. Michaels Middle/High School.

Overview
The school is located on the Eastern Shore of Maryland in the town of Easton in Talbot County. The school is on Mecklenburg Avenue, which is west of U.S. 50 and east of Maryland 565.

Students
Easton's graduation rate has been fairly steady over the past 12 years. In 2007 the school graduated 94.1%, up from 80.73% in 1997 and the highest in the previous 12 years.

The school population has increased nearly 50% over the past 12 years. In 2007 the school was at its 12-year high enrollment with 1,228 students.

Sports
State Champions

 Girls' Softball- 2002, 04, 08, 10, 11, 12, 13
 Boys' Baseball- 1987, 94, 95
 Boys' Soccer- 1989, 93, 94
 Girls' Basketball-1993, 1994
 Girls' Field Hockey- 1988, 90, 91
 Girls' Tennis Doubles- 1985, 86, 87
 Tennis Mixed Doubles-1983 
 Wrestling- 1981,
 Boys' Basketball- 1968

Notable alumni
 Casey Cep - Author
 Richard F. Colburn - former Maryland State Senator
 Jawann Kelley-Gibson - Athlete, Coach
 Jean Louisa Kelly - Actress
 Chris Moore - Film Producer
 Cynthia C. Morton - Geneticist
 Frank Robinson, Jr. - Athlete
 James Rouse - Developer; Philanthropist

See also
 List of high schools in Maryland
 Talbot County Public Schools

References

External links
Easton High School website
Map of School from Google Maps

Easton, Maryland
Public high schools in Maryland
Schools in Talbot County, Maryland